The 28th Forqué Awards, organised by EGEDA, were presented on 17 December 2022 at the IFEMA Palacio Municipal in Madrid.

Background 
The ceremony paid homage to the career of Verónica Forqué, died in December 2021. The nominations were read by Álvaro Rico, Amaia Salamanca, Eduardo Noriega, Macarena García, and Luc Knowles on 7 November 2022 at Madrid's . Later in November, Esmeralda Pimentel and Adrián Lastra were announced as the hosts of the gala.

Producer José Luis Bermúdez de Castro was gifted the EGEDA Gold Medal recognizing his lifetime achievements in the Spanish audiovisual industry.

Categories 
The winners and nominees are listed as follows:

References 

Forqué Awards
F
2022 television awards
2022 in Madrid
December 2022 events in Spain